Billy Dutton (born 9 June 1989) is a South African rugby union player, currently playing with the . He is a utility forward that can play as a lock, flanker or number eight.

Playing career

Dutton joined the Border Bulldogs academy after high school and he played for the  side in the 2009 Provincial Championship, where he made six appearances.

He again played at Under-21 level in 2010, making five appearances and scoring a try in a match against the s.

In 2015, Dutton represented amateur club side Old Selbornians in the 2015 SARU Community Cup, scoring a try against defending champions and eventual runners-up Rustenburg Impala. He was recalled to the Border Bulldogs shortly after the conclusion of the SARU Community Cup and – after a four-year absence – returned to provincial rugby, making five appearances for his side in the 2015 Vodacom Cup, which included an appearance off the bench in their only victory of the competition, when they beat the  29–5. Dutton firmly established himself in the squad during that competition, starting all five of their matches in the number eight shirt. However, his side had another poor season, losing their first four matches before bouncing back to beat the  44–20 in their final match of the season.

At the start of 2016, Dutton was one of six Border Bulldogs players that joined the ' Super Rugby squad for a trial period as they prepared for the 2016 Super Rugby season. However, he returned to Border Bulldogs after he failed to be contracted for the Super Rugby side.

Statistics

References

1989 births
Living people
Border Bulldogs players
Rugby union flankers
Rugby union locks
Rugby union number eights
Rugby union players from East London, Eastern Cape
South African rugby union players
Eastern Province Elephants players